Maria Euphrosyne of Zweibrücken (14 February 1625 – 24 October 1687) was a countess palatine, a cousin and foster-sibling of Queen Christina of Sweden, and a sister of King Charles X of Sweden. She was also, after the accession of her brother Charles X on the throne (1654), a titular Royal Princess of Sweden.

Biography

Early life
Maria Euphrosyne was born at Stegeborg Castle, Östergötland, to Count Palatine John Casimir of Zweibrücken and Princess Catherine of Sweden. In 1622, her family fled from Germany during the Thirty Years War and settled in the birth country of her mother, Sweden, where Maria Euphrosyne herself was born three years later. She spent her first years at Stegeborg Castle, the fief of her mother. In 1632, her mother was given the responsibility of her cousin, Queen Christina, and Maria Euphrosyne was from that moment brought up with her cousin the Queen: she and her siblings stayed at their court also after the death of their mother in 1638, while their father remained at Stegeborg. Maria Euphrosyne was given a very good education, being brought up with Christina, but she was eventually tutored separately, because Christina as a monarch was considered to require an education otherwise unsuitable for her sex.

During the Reign of Christina
In 1643, she received a proposal from Count Henry of Nassau. According to a letter of Christina, Henry was a rich and beautiful Prince who was well liked by Maria Euphrosyne. She left the decision to her father, however: he was uncertain as to whether Henry could support her, and in 1645, after Christina stated that she was fully capable of arranging a marriage for the same status for her relative in Sweden, he denied Henry. On 15 March 1645, Maria Euphrosyne was engaged to the Queen's favorite Count Magnus Gabriel De la Gardie, and on 7 March 1647, she married him in the Royal Chapel of Tre Kronor (castle) in Stockholm. The marriage was arranged by Christina. Traditional myth has regarded this as a love triangle: Christina and Maria Euphrosyne were both believed to have been in love with Magnus Gabriel, and in the end, Christina gave up the plans of marrying him herself, and gave him to her cousin with the words: I give to you what I cannot have myself. A famous play has been written about this drama. It is not known how much of this legendary love triangle is true, however. According to Maria Euphrosyne herself, the purpose was to show them both her favor. Magnus Gabriel had, according to her own memoirs, fallen in love with her at the age of eighteen, and due to the love letters exchanged by them during their marriage, at least Maria Euphrosyne certainly had strong feelings of affection for him. The marriage has however not been described as happy. At the wedding, Christina granted her several estates, among them her grandmother's favorite residence Höjentorp, which was also to be her favorite, as well as a great personal allowance, which was later confirmed by her brother upon his succession. In 1653, Magnus Gabriel lost his favor with Christina and was expelled from court, and she tried to act as a mediator. Maria Euphrosyne had a close relationship with her brother Charles, and did what she could to support his planned marriage with Christina.

During the Reign of Charles X and Charles XI
At the coronation of her brother King Charles X Gustavus in 1654, Maria Euphrosyne was granted the rank and status of a Royal Princess of Sweden. This was opposed by some parts of the nobility. Maria Euphrosyne did not use the title of Countess, but was generally referred to as  Princess. Maria Euphrosyne visited both her spouse and her brother in warfare: she visited her spouse in Germany and, in 1656, in Riga in Swedish Livonia, from where she had to flee again with her courtiers after just two weeks when the Russians set fire to the city. During the Dano-Swedish War (1658-1660), she and her sister-in-law Queen Hedvig Eleonora lived at Kronborg in Denmark after it had been taken by the Swedish general Carl Gustaf Wrangel. In 1658, her brother King Charles told her that he wished to make her spouse Lord High Chancellor of Sweden, but she convinced him not to by saying that Magnus Gabriel was more suited for military work. In 1660, she was present at the death bed of her brother in Gothenburg. He promised her great estates in Denmark, pensions for her children, and told her that he had named her consort Lord High Chancellor of Sweden in his will against her wish.

Maria Euphrosyne was very active as a mediator and a spokesperson for supplicants who wished to speak to her spouse or to her brother the King (and later her nephew the King) on their behalf. This matters were not only small things, they also concerned women asking her to use her contacts to acquire offices of great political importance for their male relatives. In the same fashion, she acted as a mediator between her consort and the royal house, especially when he was out of favor. At Karlberg Palace, she received her supplicants in a room with paintings of her royal brother and mother, with a door open to the room where her brother the King had slept when he was a guest in her house. Contemporary view was that her spouse had her to thank for his successful career.

In 1676, Lisbeth Carlsdotter, a witness in the Katarina witch trials inspired by the famous Gävle-Boy, tried to implicate Maria Euphrosyne and her sister-in-law Maria Sofia for sorcery. This accusations was not taken seriously, but instead discredited the credibility of Lisbeth Carlsdotter as a witness and eventually led to the whole trial being dissolved.

In 1680, her spouse fell in favor of her nephew, the monarch, after the death of Johan Göransson Gyllenstierna. She was denied an audience with her nephew without witnesses and had no success in getting her spouse in favor. After she, by using her contacts, managed to get an audience in private with the King, however, she told him that she hoped Gyllenstierna was now in Hell, and the result was that her spouse was appointed Seneschal. During the great reduction of her nephew King Charles XI in the 1680s, a lot of the property of the family was confiscated by the crown. Maria Euphrosyne was not above using her status as the aunt of the King to avoid confiscation, but she was only moderately successful: in 1685, she was allowed to keep her own personal allowance and her favorite residence, Höjentorp Castle, Västergötland, but the confiscation of her husband's property continued undisturbed. Maria Euphrosyne became a widow in 1686. This was in the middle of the reduction. The King refused to pay for the funeral of her spouse, and to stop the creditors from inventorying her own personal possessions and jewelry as well. She died at Höjentorp. 

Maria Euphrosyne was described as religious. She had her German saying »Gott ist mir allés» carved at a wall at Läckö Castle, as well as at a medallion, and in 1681, she anonymously published the German language prayer book »Der geistlich-hungerigen seelen himmelisches manna». In 1682, she wrote her own autobiography.

Family
Maria Euphrosyne married Count Magnus Gabriel De la Gardie on 7 March 1647. Of their eleven children, only three survived childhood, and only one (Hedvig Ebba), had issue; but her only child himself died childless.

Issue
Gustaf Adolf De la Gardie (1647–1695), unmarried, no issue.
Catharina Charlotta De la Gardie (1655-1697), married Count Otto Wilhelm Königsmarck, no issue.
Hedvig Ebba De la Gardie (1657–1700 ), married Count Carl Gustaf Eriksson Oxenstierna af Södermöre, and had one son, who died childless.

Ancestry

References 

 Sven Axel Hallbäck - Läckö slott (Läckö palace)
  Anteckningar om svenska qvinnor, Wilhelmina Stålberg, P. G. Berg (Notes on Swedish women) 
 Svenska Familj-Journalen (Swedish family journal) 
 Norrhem, Svante (2007). Kvinnor vid maktens sida : 1632-1772. Lund: Nordic Academic Press. Libris 10428618.  
 Svenska Familj-Journalen 
 Riksarkivet SBL Maria Euphrosine De la Gardie 

House of Palatinate-Zweibrücken
Maria 1654
1625 births
1687 deaths
Countesses Palatine of Zweibrücken
Burials at Varnhem Abbey
17th-century Swedish writers
17th-century Swedish women writers
People of the Swedish Empire
De la Gardie family
Court of Christina, Queen of Sweden